Weiser may refer to:

Places
 Weiser, Idaho
 Weiser State Forest
 Weiser Township, North Dakota
 Weiser River

People
 Conrad Weiser (1696–1760), German pioneer
 Grethe Weiser (1903–1970), German actress
 Johann Conrad Weiser, Sr. (1662–1746), German Palatine
 Mark Weiser (1952–1999), chief scientist of Xerox PARC
 Malbim (1809–1879) (Meïr Löb ben Jehiel Michel Weiser), Russian rabbi
 Mitchell Weiser (born 1994), German footballer
 Peter M. Weiser (1781–c. 1825-1828), member of the Corps of Discovery
 Ronald Weiser (born 1945), American Diplomat
 Sarah Banet-Weiser, American academic and author

Others
Weiser (film), a film directed by Wojciech Marczewski (2001)
Red Wheel Weiser Conari, a publisher previously known as Weiser or Samuel Weiser, Inc from 1956 to 2000

See also
Weise,a surname
Weisse, a surname
Wieser, a surname

German-language surnames